Neocercophana is a monotypic moth genus in the family Saturniidae described by Izquierdo in 1895. Its only species, Neocercophana philippii, was described by the same author in the same year. The type specimen was described from Chile.

References

Cercophaninae
Endemic fauna of Chile